Stitch's Supersonic Celebration was a live stage show featuring Stitch performed in the Tomorrowland section of the Magic Kingdom at the Walt Disney World Resort. Construction began in the east of Tomorrowland in late 2008 and was completed in April 2009. Opening on May 6, 2009, the show received poor critical reception and closed the following month.

Synopsis
The show featured a host named Tip Trendo, supposedly an on-the-scene reporter for the Tomorrowland News Network (TNN). There were also four female backup dancers, as well as two robots. The star, however, was Stitch, initially on a video screen and then in costumed form. The Stitch character on the video screen was able to interact with guests, using the same technology as in Turtle Talk with Crush, an interactive show inside The Seas with Nemo and Friends at Disney's Epcot theme park. During "Stitch's Supersonic Celebration", guests celebrated "Galaxy Day" by singing and dancing along to an odd mixture of popular music, including Elvis Presley tunes, "The Future Has Arrived" from Meet the Robinsons, and "These Boots Are Made for Walkin'".

Closing
After only a six-week run, Stitch's Supersonic Celebration closed on June 27, 2009.  Some credit the show's early demise to the lack of shade; there were only a few awnings under which to hide from the hot Florida sun. Also, the screen where Stitch was shown was hard to see under direct sunlight. The stage originally built for Stitch's Supersonic Celebration is now used seasonally for stage shows such as "A Totally Tomorrowland Christmas Show" during Mickey's Very Merry Christmas Party.

References

External links
 Stitch's Supersonic Celebration on YouTube

Lilo & Stitch in amusement parks
Former Walt Disney Parks and Resorts attractions
Walt Disney Parks and Resorts entertainment
Tomorrowland
Magic Kingdom